Our Masters, the Servants (French: Nos maîtres les domestiques) is a 1930 French comedy film directed by Hewitt Claypoole Grantham-Hayes and starring Louis Baron fils, Henri Garat and René Ferté. It was made at Twickenham Studios in England due to delays in equipping French studios for sound.

Cast
 Louis Baron fils as Joseph  
 Henri Garat as Maruis Richard d'Argental  
 René Ferté as Henri Duplessis  
 Georges Tréville as Col. de montausset-Brissac  
 Jacques Henley as Inspector Lerand  
 Diana as Sylvie Mareuil  
 Madeleine Guitty as Augustine  
 Michèle Verly as Evangéline Lovejoy  
 Ginette Gaubert as Hélène Grandcourt  
 Renée Parme as Louise 
 Simone Mareuil

References

Bibliography 
Bessy, Maurice & Chirat, Raymond. Histoire du cinéma français: 1929-1934. Pygmalion, 1988.

External links 
 

1930 films
1930 comedy films
French comedy films
1930s French-language films
Films shot at Twickenham Film Studios
French black-and-white films
1930s French films